Maple Valley-Anthon Oto Community School District, or Maple Valley-Anthon Oto Community Schools, is a rural public school district headquartered in Mapleton, Iowa.  It includes sections of Monona County and Woodbury County with small areas in Ida, and Crawford counties. It serves the towns of Mapleton, Anthon, Oto, Castana, Danbury, Rodney, and the surrounding rural areas, including the unincorporated area of Ticonic.

History
It was established on July 1, 2012, from the merger of the Anthon–Oto Community School District and the Maple Valley Community School District. The vote for merging the districts was scheduled for February 1, 2011.

From 2005 until 2015 what is now known as MVAO and the MVAO of 2015 lost a total of 178 students. Due to the decline in enrollments, in January 2017 the MVAO district and the Charter Oak–Ute Community School District entered into a grade-sharing arrangement in which one district sends its students to another district for certain grade levels. As a result, the Charter Oak–Ute high school closed. MVAO High School was renamed MVAOCOU High School. Charter Oak–Ute will pay MVAO tuition costs.

Jeff Thelander has been the superintendent since 2019.

Schools
The district operates four schools:
 Anthon Elementary School
 Mapleton Elementary School
 MVAO Middle School
 MVAOCOU High School

MVAOCOU High School

Athletics
The Rams compete in the Western Valley Activities Conference in the following sports:
Cross Country
Volleyball
Football
Basketball
Track and Field
Golf
Baseball
Softball

See also
List of school districts in Iowa
List of high schools in Iowa

References

External links
 Maple Valley-Anthon Oto Community School District

School districts in Iowa
2012 establishments in Iowa
School districts established in 2012
Education in Monona County, Iowa
Education in Ida County, Iowa
Education in Crawford County, Iowa
Education in Woodbury County, Iowa